Sungai Durian, or "Durian River", is a mukim in Hilir Perak District, Perak, Malaysia.

Location

Sungai Durian is a polling district in the federal constituency of Pasir Salak and in the state constituency of Kampong Gajah.
The kapong is on the northwest bank of the Perak River, opposite the town of Teluk Intan on the other bank.

The village was founded by the British government in 1950 during the post-war insurrection.
The name is said to have come from a misunderstanding. 
At that time there was a durian tree growing beside the river.
A British government official trying to find the name of the place by pointing at it was told first that it was "Sungai" (River) and then that it was "Durian" (the type of tree). 
He put the two together to give the present name.

Population

As of 2011 the village had 1,322 formal housing units, with a total population of about 4,000.
The entire population is Chinese in origin, mainly Hakka, and believe in Taoism.
The main economic activity is rubber tapping.
Fishing and growing vegetables are sidelines, and the village has a small furniture manufacturing business.
There is a kindergarten, primary school, clinic, public hall, auditorium, Kuan temple, leisure park and children's amusement park.

Notes

Sources

Hilir Perak District
Mukims of Perak